The 1973 Scottish League Cup final was played on 15 December 1973 and was the final of the 28th Scottish League Cup competition. It was contested by Dundee and Celtic. Dundee won the match 1–0, with Gordon Wallace scoring the winning goal.

Match details

Media coverage
In Scotland highlights of the final was shown on BBC One Scotland on their Sportsreel programme in the evening and also on STV and Grampian Television on the former's Scotsport programme the following day.

References

External links
 Soccerbase

1973
League Cup Final
Scottish League Cup Final 1973
Scottish League Cup Final 1973
20th century in Glasgow